Robert Sherman may refer to:

 Robert A. Sherman (born 1953), Massachusetts attorney and U.S. ambassador to Portugal from 2014 to 2017
 Robert B. Sherman (1925–2012), American songwriter and screenwriter
 Robert J. Sherman (born 1968), American-born songwriter, son of Robert B. Sherman
 Robert Sherman (music critic) (born 1932), American music critic, radio personality, academic, and writer on music
 Rob Sherman (1953–2016), American atheist activist, perennial candidate, and businessman
 Bob Sherman (actor) (1940–2004), actor noted for work in such shows as The Sandbaggers
 Bobby Sherman (Robert Cabot Sherman, Jr., born 1943), teen idol
 Bob Sherman (American football) (born 1942), former Pittsburgh Steelers and Iowa Hawkeyes player
 Bob Sherman (radio executive), WNBC radio executive
 Robert Sherman (writer) (1926–1997), film producer, screenwriter, and actor, credited for Too Late the Hero and Dallas